

Technology 
Sigma-delta modulation
 Seed-based d mapping, a meta-analytic method for neuroimaging.
 Software development methodology
 Cap Gemini SDM, a software system development method originally written by PANDATA.
 Sparse Distributed Memory
 Space-division Multiplexing

Transportation 
 Brown Field Municipal Airport, San Diego, US, IATA designator
 Shieldmuir railway station, Scotland, National Rail code
 Stadium MRT station, Singapore, MRT station abbreviation
 Watergardens railway station, Melbourne, code

Other 
 Slovenian Democratic Youth 
 Standard Days Method, a calendar-based method of contraception
 Sub-Divisional Magistrate, India
 Shoppers Drug Mart, a Canadian pharmacy chain
 Squared deviations from the mean, in mathematics
 Shared decision-making in medicine
 Scarlet Devil Mansion, a location in the danmaku video-game series Touhou Project